is a series of light novels written by Shoji Gatoh and illustrated by Shiki Douji. The series follows Sousuke Sagara, a member of the covert anti-terrorist private military organization known as Mithril, tasked with protecting Kaname Chidori, a hot-headed Japanese high school girl.

Individual chapters are published on Monthly Dragon Magazine, followed by a paperback compilation released by Fujimi Shobo's Fujimi Fantasia Bunko. The novels are split between stories focusing on Sousuke's mission as a soldier of Mithril and comedic side stories centered on his life at Jindai High School.

The series has been adapted into different media; including four anime television series: Full Metal Panic! by Gonzo in 2002, Full Metal Panic? Fumoffu and Full Metal Panic! The Second Raid by Kyoto Animation in 2003 and 2005 respectively. An OVA was also released in 2006; and the newest television series, Full Metal Panic! Invisible Victory by Xebec, premiered in April 2018. The series also had several different manga series.

Tokyopop licensed the novels for English-language publication in North America and released parts of the series, while ADV Films licensed and dubbed the first season and the spin-off. The second season was licensed by Kadokawa Pictures USA with ADV Films producing the dub yet again. Mandalay Pictures acquired the film rights to the series in 2009. At Anime USA 2009, Funimation announced that it had acquired the rights to the first and second series of Full Metal Panic! and both were re-released and remastered on DVD and Blu-ray in 2010. The series began airing in North America on November 22, 2010, on the Funimation Channel. The Fumoffu series made its North American television debut on the Funimation Channel on November 15, 2010.

A spin-off to the light-novel series called Full Metal Panic! Another was serialized between 2011 and 2016. Another received a manga adaptation split in two series.
The light novels have sold 11 million copies making it the twelfth best-selling light novel.

Plot

The series follows Sousuke Sagara, a member of a covert anti-terrorist private military organization known as Mithril, tasked with protecting Kaname Chidori, a spirited Japanese high school girl. He moves to Japan to study at Chidori's school, Jindai High School, with assistance from his comrades Kurz Weber and Melissa Mao. Having never experienced social interactions, Sousuke is seen as a military maniac by his schoolmates as he interprets everyday situations from a combat perspective. He comes to relate with Chidori who realizes that Sousuke is protecting her, but he does not reveal the reasons due to orders as well as the fact that he does not know why Chidori is being targeted by different organizations.

Development
When starting the series, Shoji Gatoh commented that as the series' theme was "Boy Meets Girl." Gatoh worked in the order to keep that as the focus regardless of the several other conflicts the story presented. Gatoh and Shiki Douji had a close relationship in the making of the novels. Gatoh gave Douji freedom in the design of the characters such as Sagara and Leonardo who were given multiple traits. On the other hand, Gatoh also gave Douji references for "gentlemen" featured in the story.

In the making of the series Gatoh did not find difficulties in creating a balance between sci-fi and realistic elements since multiple Japanese series like Tetsujin 28 and Mazinger Z already provide the demographic a mixture between those elements. Originally, Douji felt that the characters were too realistic. Believing the teenage demographic would not like them, the author changed them so that were seen as cooler characters. While the duo did not have difficulties with the novels' serious storylines, they still had problems with comedy.

Chidori and Sousuke's relationship was based on Japanese comedy due to how the two interact. In order to create a more interesting dynamic between the two leads, Gatoh wanted to change the ways Sagara and Chidori interact as he was tired of female characters requiring to be protected in the making for the light novels. As a result, Chidori instead supports Sagara multiple times.

Media

Light novels

The light novel series Full Metal Panic! is written by Shoji Gatoh and illustrated by Shiki Douji. It was serialised by Fujimi Shobo in its monthly magazine Gekkan Dragon Magazine since June 1998 and published under the Fujimi Fantasia Bunko imprint in tankōbon format since September 1998. Gatoh often found delays in writing of the novels, which led to delays to the publication of the series' volumes. The series focuses on Sergeant Sousuke Sagara's arrival to the Jindai High School where he was assigned to protect the student Kaname Chidori while also acting as a student.

A total of twelve full length volumes have been released from September 18, 1998, to August 20, 2010. In parallel to the twelve volumes, nine standalone light novels of the series (which form the short story collection) have also been published from December 17, 1998, to August 20, 2011. Finally two more volumes titled Side Arms focusing on the past of some characters (which form the side story collection) and the birth of Mithril and Amalgam have been published on April 20, 2004, and July 20, 2006. In contrast to the full length volumes, short story collection focuses on the comedy elements from the series. In January 2010, Gatoh wrote another of these stories in celebration of Gekkan Dragon Magazines 300th issue, which has been included in the last short story collection volume. Another series of spin-off novels has been released by Naoto Ōguro with supervision of Shoji Gatoh from August 20, 2011, to February 20, 2016, consisting of thirteen volumes and set years after the original series' ending. The light novels have also been adapted into various manga, as well as three anime television series and an OVA episode for which Gatoh was also part of the staff.

Tokyopop licensed the Full Metal Panic! series for North America release, publishing the first regular light novel on September 11, 2007. The latest released volume is the fourth on February 1, 2011, which is a compilation from the original fourth and fifth full-length volumes from the series. No short story collection volumes nor side story collection ones have been published and the company has shut down its publishing operations in North America on May 31, 2011. In 2015, at Anime Expo and San Diego Comic-Con, Tokyopop announced that it would be relaunching its publishing operations in North America in 2016 and that they will consider light novels, but nothing has been disclosed about Full Metal Panic! novels publication.

On March 18, 2019, J-Novel Club announced that all the original 12 novels will be translated again and released in English. The series was released as e-books starting that year, with the final volume released in 2021. Hardcover "Collectors Editions," each compiling three novels per volume, were released by J-Novel Club starting in 2020. On July 1, 2022, J-Novel announced that they were translating the short stories.

Manga

The Full Metal Panic! light novel series has been adapted to manga on multiple occasions. The first manga series: Full Metal Panic, was serialized in Monthly Comic Dragon by Retsu Tateo. This manga was collected in nine tankōbon volumes published from August 30, 2000, to July 1, 2005. Announced in July 2003, Full Metal Panic! became one of the first manga series licensed by ADV Manga. They released all of the volumes between November 10, 2003 and April 11, 2006.

A parallel series titled  which focused more on the comedic elements from the franchise was also written by Retsu Tateo and ran for seven volumes between November 1, 2003, and September 1, 2006.

 was a spin-off series by Tomohiro Nagai. Five volumes were released between January 30, 2001, and April 1, 2003. Overload was licensed by ADV Manga in December 2004, and all of its volumes were published in English between June 6, 2005, and May 24, 2006. 
Tomohiro Nagai also wrote  which is a single tankōbon manga published on July 1, 2003, focused more on the action elements from the franchise.

, written by Shoji Gatoh and illustrated by Hiroshi Ueda, focuses on the missions of Sousuke as a sergeant. The first volume was published on August 1, 2005, and the final volume: the nineteenth, was published on September 20, 2013. The story and events of this manga adaption are based on the fourth Full Metal Panic! light novel and onwards.

Anime

Full Metal Panic!

The anime series was produced by Gonzo Digimation and originally aired in 2002 after its original air date was canceled because of the September 11 attacks. The series was licensed by ADV Films for North American release in 2003. The first three novels form the basis for the anime. The series was available on the Anime Network on Demand from 2003 to 2004.

The production of 3 director's cut movies based on the first television series was announced in 2017. The 1st SECTION Boy Meets Girl premiered on November 25, 2017, at Kadokawa Cinema Shinjuku in Japan, 
2nd SECTION One Night Stand premiered on January 13, 2018, and 3rd SECTION Into the Blue premiered on January 20, 2018. Home video releases for the films were planned for February 28, 2018, for the 1st film, followed by March 28 for the 2nd film, and April 28 for the 3rd film.

Fumoffu

 is a companion series to the anime series Full Metal Panic! by Kyoto Animation, and takes place between the first season and The Second Raid. Markedly different in tone to the first series, Fumoffu is based on the more comical short stories Gatou published alongside the main novels, emphasizing the high school romantic comedy aspects of Full Metal Panic! with often crude humor and focuses on the romantic tension between Sousuke Sagara and Kaname Chidori. It frequently parodies itself and anime stereotypes. None of the mecha combat or political intrigue, which characterized much of the original Full Metal Panic!, can be seen in the series. The only reference to the mecha aspect of Full Metal Panic! is the Bonta-kun, which is one of the most prominent parodies in the anime. Sousuke uses spare Bonta-kun costumes to make highly effective suits of power armor, but they look like teddy bears wearing army gear and can only say: "Fu" and "Mo" in different combinations.

The Second Raid

 is the direct sequel to the original anime series. It was produced by Kyoto Animation and ran for 13 episodes. The series is based on the Ending Day by Day novels and takes place three months after the events that occurred in the Tuatha de Danaan at the end of the original Full Metal Panic! series. Mithril learns of a secret organization that has technology able to counter the ECS (Electronic Conceal System) mode. The organization, known as Amalgam, has access to Black Technology, which was obtained from the Whispered. Like the other intelligence agencies, Amalgam intends to obtain more. Sousuke's mission to protect Chidori is terminated by Mithril, instead leaving her in the care of an anonymous agent known as Wraith.

There is a one episode OVA that takes place after Full Metal Panic! The Second Raid. It is a humorous stand-alone story. It focuses on the Captain of the Tuatha De Danaan: Teletha Tessa Testarossa, rather than the two main characters of the series. The OVA is based on short story Wari to Hima na Sentaichou no Ichi Nichi (A comparatively leisurely day of the squadron commander) in short story collection Dounimo Naranai Gori Muchuu (Helpless in the thick of it). The story is also told in chapters 13 & 14 of Full Metal Panic Sigma manga volume 4.

Home video releases also included an "episode 000" and a 7-part Location Scouting in Hong Kong documentary. Episode 000 includes footage from various parts of the television broadcast episodes, but also includes new scenes. The Location Scouting in Hong Kong documentary includes various locations the television production staff members had gone to as inspiration for creating scenes used in the Hong Kong episodes, featuring appearances from the series producers, and commentaries from them.

Invisible Victory

 is the fourth TV series in the franchise. Kyoto Animation had not returned to produce the fourth anime adaptation. Instead, it was produced by studio Xebec. It premiered in April 2018. During Anime Expo 2017, the series creator confirmed that Full Metal Panic! Invisible Victory is a "continuation" that won't contain any "explanation or expository episodes." He stated that the pacing of the story is going to be "full throttle from the get-go" although it would still "follow the original work pretty closely." The series consisted of 12 episodes. The opening song is "Even...if" and the ending song is "Yes", both performed by Tamaru Yamada.

Live action film
A live action film adaptation was announced by Mandalay Pictures in April 2009, with Zac Efron rumored to be attached to the project. Efron has since confirmed a meeting took place regarding the project but added that the adaptation was unlikely to happen.

Video game
Full Metal Panic! Fight! Who Dares Wins, developed by B.B. Studio and published by Bandai Namco Entertainment Inc., was released on May 31, 2018. Specialist Box limited edition includes Invisible Victory behind-the-scenes Blu-ray, a special novel by Shoji Gatoh, drama CD, replica autographed mini script of "Megami no Rainichi: Date Hen," a case for the Blu-ray and CD, and a special Shiki Douji-illustrated box. Early purchases include download code for the 'Armed Slave-Use Special Weapons Three Set' (Boxer 2nd Revision 76mm Shot Cannon (Armor-Piercing Ammunition) Cartridge Extension Model, ASG96-B Revision 57mm Glide Cannon, GRAW-X Single Molecule Cutter (Repulsion Field Prototype Model)).

Reception
The second DVD volume of Full Metal Panic! The Second Raid was given a favorable review by Theron Martin of Anime News Network for pushing the character developments of Sousuke and Kaname as well as dramatic elements beyond comedy and action. Describing the impact of the volume, Martin explains that "[t]he full impact of that [Sousuke and Kaname's relationship] comes out beautifully in episode 7, when Kaname seeks out Sousuke in a moment of fear and, for the first time, Sousuke isn't there for her. It's one of those telling moments that can define an entire series."

THEM Anime Reviews has noted that the Arm Slaves, like most real life vehicles, are done so meticulously that fans of mecha series would "scour online catalogues for tech books and sketches." Bureau 42 says that the "mecha[Arm Slave] action in the show is very well done. While I can't compare the action with other more grounded mecha shows like Patlabor, the combat is very well done and easy to follow, and visually interesting." Triforce commented that Arm Slave battles in the Full Metal Panic! series would be able to keep viewer's attention to the show.

Negative criticism has surfaced on the role of the Arm Slaves throughout the Full Metal Panic! series. For instance, Ender's review states that their mecha roles are confusing that the Arm Slaves are both "08th MS Team soldiers and Dragon Ball Z-type fighters, hurling energy balls at each other and going "Super Saiya-jin." Anime Database rated the Full Metal Panic! series 4 out of 5 because of the Arm Slaves battles since they start out from being good to being very unrealistic. GameSpot Union comments on the relationship between the Arm Slaves and the animation done on Full Metal Panic!, saying both animation and camera views were bad.

The novels have over 11 million copies in print.

See also
Amagi Brilliant Park, another series written by Shoji Gatoh

References

Further reading

External links

 
1998 Japanese novels
2000 manga
2001 manga
2002 anime television series debuts
2003 manga
2003 anime television series debuts
2005 anime television series debuts
2006 anime OVAs
2011 Japanese novels
2012 manga
Action anime and manga
ADV Films
ADV Manga
Afghanistan in fiction
Alternate history anime
Anime and manga based on light novels
Fujimi Fantasia Bunko
Fujimi Shobo manga
Funimation
Gonzo (company)
J-Novel Club books
Japan in fiction
Japanese alternate history novels
Kadokawa Dwango franchises
Kadokawa Shoten manga
Kyoto Animation
Light novels
Military anime and manga
Real robot anime and manga
Science fiction anime and manga
Seinen manga
Shōnen manga
Television shows based on light novels
Terrorism in fiction
Xebec (studio)